Leucaena leucocephala is a small fast-growing mimosoid tree native to southern Mexico and northern Central America (Belize and Guatemala) and is now naturalized throughout the tropics including parts of Asia.

Common names include jumbay, pearl wattle (called so because of its yellowish white hue), white leadtree,   river tamarind, ipil-ipil, tan-tan, and white popinac.

Leucaena leucocephala is used for a variety of purposes, such as fencing, soil fertility, firewood, fiber, and livestock fodder.

Use by humans
During the 1970s and 1980s, it was promoted as a "miracle tree" for its multiple uses. It has also been described as a "conflict tree" because it is used for forage production but spreads like a weed in some places.

The legume is promoted in several countries of Southeast Asia (at least Burma, Cambodia, Indonesia, Laos, and Thailand), most importantly as a source of quality animal feed, but also for residual use for firewood or charcoal production.

Forage and fodder
The legume provides an excellent source of high-protein cattle fodder.  However, the fodder contains mimosine, a toxic amino acid. Horses and donkeys which are fed it lose their hair.

In many cases this acid is metabolized by ruminants to goitrogenic DHP [3-hydroxy-4(1H) pyridone] in the rumen, but in some geographical areas, ruminants lack the organisms (such as Synergistes jonesii) that can degrade DHP.

In such cases, toxicity problems from ingestion of Leucaena have sometimes been overcome by infusing susceptible animals with rumen fluid from ruminants that possess such organisms, and more recently by inoculating cattle rumina with such organisms cultured in vitro.

Such measures have facilitated Leucaena use for fodder in Australia and elsewhere.

Green manure and biomass production
Leucaena leucocephala has been considered for biomass production because its reported yield of foliage corresponds to a dried mass of  kg/ha/year, and that of wood 30–40 m³/ha/year, with up to twice those amounts in favorable climates. In India it is being promoted for both fodder and energy.

It is also efficient in nitrogen fixation, at more than 500 kg/ha/year.

It has a very fast growth rate: young trees reach a height of more than 20 ft in two to three years.

Food for humans
The young pods are edible and occasionally eaten in Javanese vegetable salad with spicy peanut sauce, and spicy fish wrapped in papaya or taro leaves in Indonesia, and in papaya salad in Laos and Thailand, where they are known as phak krathin. In Mexico it is eaten in soups and also inside tacos, it is known as guaje. Additionally, the state of Oaxaca in Mexico derives its name from the Nahuatl word huaxyacac, the name for Leucaena leucocephala trees that are found around Oaxaca City.

Pulpwood for paper industry
Recently, the wood part of the Subabul tree is used for making pulp in the pulp and paper industry. In the southern and central states of India, Subabul is the most important pulpwood species for making pulp. It has huge positive socio-economic impact on the livelihood of the small farmers where Subabul is grown as an industrial crop. This provides an alternate crop choice to the farmers of Andhra Pradesh and Telangana states of India where they are also growing cotton and chillies.

Invasive properties
Leucaena leucocephala is considered one of the 100 worst invasive species by the Invasive Species Specialist Group of the IUCN Species Survival Commission.

It is a highly invasive species in the arid parts of Taiwan, The Bahamas, the Hawaiian Islands, Fiji, Puerto Rico, Hong Kong, South Africa, and northern Australia, as well as in South America and Southern Europe.

The plant is also found in parts of the U.S., including California, Arizona, Texas, and Florida.

It grows quickly and forms dense thickets that crowd out all native vegetation.

In urban areas, it is an especially unwanted species, growing along arid roadsides, in carparks, and on abandoned land.

Other limitations
This species is susceptible to insect infestations. In the 1980s, a widespread loss in Southeast Asia was due to pest attack by psyllids.

In India, this tree was initially promoted for afforestation due to its fast-growing nature. However, it is now considered unsuitable for urban planting because of its tendency to get uprooted in rain and wind. Eight of every ten trees uprooted by wind in Pune are L. leucocephala.

The seeds contain mimosine, an amino acid known to be toxic to nonruminant vertebrates.

Potential as bioherbicidal agent
Leucaena leucocephala is an allelopathic tree. Phytotoxic allelochemicals, such as mimosine and certain phenolic compounds, including p-hydroxycinnamic acid, protocatechuic acid, and gallic acid, have been identified in the leaves of the species. Bioherbicidal activity of L. leucocephala on terrestrial plants and aquatic weed water hyacinth were reported.

Gallery

References

External links

Handbook of Energy Crops at Purdue University: Leucaena leucocephala
Economics of Subabul Plantation In Hegde, N.G. and Abhyanker, P.D. (eds.) The Greening of Wastelands.
Relwani, L.L. & Hegde, N.G. 1986.
Leucaena leucocephala factsheet
Pradip Krishen, 'Trees of Delhi a Field Guide', DK publishers, Page 291, 2006

Asian vegetables
leucocephala
Plants described in 1961
Forages
Trees of Belize
Trees of Guatemala
Trees of Mexico
Drought-tolerant trees
Taxa named by Jean-Baptiste Lamarck